The Parole Officer is a 2001 British comedy film, directed by John Duigan. The film follows a diverse group of former criminals as they assist their probation officer in proving his innocence after a murder accusation.

Plot

Simon Garden is a well-meaning but ineffectual probation officer. At the beginning of the film, he is facing a tribunal after all of his colleagues in his department in Blackpool submit complaints against him, Garden having had only three successes in his career. He is transferred to Manchester. He has hypoglycemia and regularly eats crisps to deal with it.

In Manchester, he starts his new role and meets an attractive WPC, Emma. While looking into the case of a "client", Kirsty, a juvenile delinquent who had had Class A drugs planted on her, Simon witnesses the murder of an accountant by corrupt police officer Detective Inspector Burton. He is discovered, chased from the building by two bouncers and after being cornered, ends up falling into a canal. He has inadvertently left his wallet containing identification at the crime scene and is duly framed for the accountant's murder by DI Burton. Simon goes to the police with the story, but ends up being interviewed by Burton, who is leading the investigation. He releases Simon, but threatens him with prison unless he keeps quiet about the officer's drugs scam and the murder.

Simon first decides to leave Manchester for good and, feeling down, rejects the offer of a meal from Emma. While away from the city, he walks past a shop where the TV in the window happens to be showing an interview with Burton, who will be receiving a bravery award. It triggers his memory of the murder – he realises that a CCTV camera had filmed the whole event. He realises that this security tape will clear his name and show that Burton was the real murderer. He returns to the club where the murder took place to try to find the tape, only to discover that it has been taken to a bank and placed in a safety deposit box. Simon sets out to round up his four successful ex-clients. He visits George in Blackpool and convinces him to join the plan. They recruit Jeff, who has been working as a fishmonger, and Colin, who has been working in a computer shop. They visit the home of the former master-criminal Viktor, only to find his wife and his grave; his wife takes them to Viktor's secret underground workshop and says they can take whatever equipment they want from his extensive selection of technology and safe-cracking kit.

The team gathers in Simon's house and they set out to devise a cunning plan to retrieve the tape from the bank. One evening they find that Kirsty, Simon's first client when he started his new job in Manchester, has broken in and is attempting to steal his television. When she sees what they are doing, she asks to join the gang to rob the bank, but Simon says she is too young. They tell her she has to leave but she convinces them that she will be small enough to slip through a vent that someone needs to access as part of their heist plan. The team members train together, organise equipment, deploy a computer virus, and invent a GOTLER (George-operated time-lock equalising robot). Over time they bond as a group, have fun together, and formulate their plan. However, one night, DI Burton and several police officers (including Emma) search the house for the head of the murdered accountant. DI Burton has obviously planted it in Simon's house and, despite Kirsty's attempt to dispose of it, manages to frame Simon and the others: they are arrested, and end up in a police cell. Kirsty is taken away by the police, but manages to slip away from them at a garage. Simon tries to explain to Emma about the plan to clear his name but, because she feels that he has hidden things from her, she is reluctant to listen. Simon, George, Colin, and Jeff are in their cell wondering what to do when the back of a van crashes through the wall – it is Kirsty, who has stolen a van and is rescuing them. They jump in and speed off with Kirsty at the wheel, determined to try to get to the bank and put the plan into action.

Once there, they sneak on to the roof, activate all of Manchester's alarms, and climb into the building. Simon uses the robot to activate the door, and they grab the tape. A man in disguise, who is apparently Victor, turns up, but the group is collecting money as well, before he vanishes. Once the job is done, the group flees from the bank. They finally arrive at the town hall, where DI Burton is earning a bravery award for saving Kirsty from a burning car earlier in the film. Despite being attacked by Burton's sidekicks, Simon finally proves his innocence by revealing the tape to the public, and Burton is arrested. Amidst the celebrations, Simon and Emma link with each other and kiss.

Cast

Production
Despite the film being set in Manchester, some of the filming took place in nearby Liverpool. Notably, the bank in the film where the heist takes place is the former Bank of England building on Castle Street.

Reception
On Rotten Tomatoes the film has an approval rating of 57% based on reviews from 7 critics.  Most reviews favourably compared the film to Ealing Studios' heist comedies of the 1950s and 60s, although noted aspects of vulgarity.

For example, Philip French, writing in The Observer stated "The film is mildly amusing and more than competently acted [but] contains very little that's original and nothing that throws any light on contemporary life. Indeed, all that distinguishes Coogan's film from British heist pictures of the 1950s and 1960s is the vulgarity and excursions into grossness." Similarly, Neil Smith, writing for BBC Movies online noted "What follows mixes the light-hearted antics of The Lavender Hill Mob with such high brow gags as Simon chundering on a roller-coaster or disposing of a phallus sculpture in a ladies' loo."

Derek Elley, writing the Variety was also complimentary, noting "Though much of the film revolves round the persona of Coogan...overall it's more of an ensemble piece than a one-man showcase, and better for it."

Steve Coogan, said "Whenever I think of The Parole Officer, I squirm. And when someone says they like it, I think, "Really, why?" I'm pleased that they like it, but it's like a children's film."

The film grossed £3.4 million in the United Kingdom.

References

External links
 

2001 films
2001 comedy films
2000s English-language films
British comedy films
DNA Films films
Films scored by Alex Heffes
Films set in Blackpool
Films set in Manchester
Films shot in Greater Manchester
Films directed by John Duigan
Malware in fiction
2000s British films